"Breathe Today" is a song by American rock band Flyleaf. The song originally appeared on the band's self-titled EP and was released as a single in 2004 in promotion of that release. The song was re-recorded for the band's self-titled debut and that version of the song was released as a single in 2007.

Music video
A music video was created for the 2004 version of the song and was directed by Dave Garcia. The video alternates between shots of vocalist Lacey Mosley wandering around a dirty bathroom and the band performing the song in a room.

Track listing
Promo single

Enhanced single

2007 single

Personnel
 Lacey Mosley − vocals
 Sameer Bhattacharya − guitar
 Jared Hartmann − guitar
 Pat Seals − bass
 James Culpepper − drums

Charts

References

External links
Official Music Video at YouTube

2004 singles
Flyleaf (band) songs
2004 songs
Song recordings produced by Howard Benson
A&M Octone Records singles